The 2008 World Rowing Championships were World Rowing Championships that were held from 22 to 27 July 2008 in conjunction with the World Junior Rowing Championships in Ottensheim near Linz, Austria. Since 2008 was an Olympic year for rowing, the World Championships did not include Olympic events scheduled for the 2008 Summer Olympics, or the adaptive rowing events at the 2008 Summer Paralympics.

Medal summary

Men's events

Women's events

Medal table

References

World Rowing Championships
World Rowing Championships
Rowing competitions in Austria
Rowing Championships
2008 in Austrian sport
Rowing